Theo Ashton Thompson (March 31, 1916 – July 1, 1965) was a U.S. Representative from Louisiana's 7th congressional district in the southwestern corner of the state.

Born in Ville Platte in Evangeline Parish in south Louisiana, Thompson attended public schools there. From 1932 to 1934, he completed a two-year course in higher accounting at Louisiana State University in Baton Rouge. From 1934 to 1940, Thompson was the traveling auditor for the Louisiana Highway Commission. In 1942, he was the Louisiana representative at the National Assembly of the States in the development of the civil defense program at a convention held in Chicago, Illinois.

From 1942 to 1946, Thompson served during World War II in the United States Army Air Corps, the forerunner to the Air Force. From 1948 to 1952, during the administration of Governor Earl Kemp Long, Thompson was the state budget officer and financial adviser to the Louisiana State Legislature.

In 1952, Thompson ran unsuccessfully for state auditor on the Democratic gubernatorial intraparty ticket headed by Judge Carlos Spaht of Baton Rouge. Thompson lost to then fellow Democrat, and later Republican, Allison Kolb, also of Baton Rouge, for the auditor's position. Former Lieutenant Governor Bill Dodd, who also sought the governorship in 1952 against Spaht and the eventual winner, Robert F. Kennon, in turn unseated Kolb in the 1956 primary for auditor.

From 1947 to 1953, Thompson was the chairman of the board of trustees of the Louisiana State Employees Retirement System. In 1950 and 1951, he was the representative of the United States Department of State in Louisiana in training foreign representatives in principles of democracy.

Thompson was elected as a Democrat to the Eighty-third and to the six succeeding Congresses and served from January 3, 1953, until his death July 1, 1965, in an automobile accident in Gastonia, North Carolina. While in Congress he was a signatory to the 1956 Southern Manifesto that opposed the desegregation of public schools ordered by the Supreme Court in Brown v. Board of Education.

He was interred at Evangeline Memorial Park Cemetery in Ville Platte.

Thompson was succeeded in Congress by the future Governor Edwin Washington Edwards, then a state senator from Acadia Parish.

See also

 List of United States Congress members who died in office (1950–99)

References

1916 births
1965 deaths
20th-century American politicians
American accountants
American segregationists
Democratic Party members of the United States House of Representatives from Louisiana
Louisiana State University alumni
People from Ville Platte, Louisiana
Road incident deaths in North Carolina
United States Army Air Forces personnel of World War II